Harmologa sisyrana is a species of moth of the family Tortricidae. It is found in New Zealand.

The wingspan is about 18 mm. The forewings are fuscous, irrorated (speckled) with whitish and sprinkled with ferruginous and blackish specks. The markings are darker fuscous, with strigulae (fine streaks) of blackish and ferruginous irroration. The hindwings are pale greyish, marbled with darker.

References

Moths described in 1883
Archipini
Moths of New Zealand
Taxa named by Edward Meyrick